''Labidochromis'' sp. "Mbamba", or the "Yellow Top Mbamba", is a maternal mouthbrooding cichlid fish from Lake Malawi, so far formally undescribed. They belong to the groups of fishes locally named mbuna which means rock dweller. They are one of the smaller mbuna species growing to 3-4inches as adults.

References

Undescribed vertebrate species
Labidochromis